William Peters (1702–1786) was a prominent figure in Philadelphia in the colonial and revolutionary era.

He was born in Liverpool, England, and went to America in 1739, four years after his younger brother, Reverend Richard Peters. He was a lawyer and served as judge of the courts of common pleas, quarter sessions, and orphans' court. When the revolution was beginning, he sided with the Whigs, befriending George Washington, von Steuben, James Madison and Benjamin Franklin.

His 1745 home, the Belmont Mansion, still stands in Philadelphia's Fairmount Park.

His son, Richard Peters, Jr. (the junior to distinguish him from his famous uncle), was also a lawyer and represented Pennsylvania in the Continental Congress.

1702 births
1786 deaths
Lawyers from Philadelphia
Lawyers from Liverpool
People of colonial Pennsylvania
English emigrants